Bougainvillea spectabilis, also known as great bougainvillea, is a species of flowering plant. It is native to Brazil, Bolivia, Peru, and Argentina's Chubut Province.

Description
Bougainvillea spectabilis grows as a woody vine or shrub, reaching  with heart-shaped leaves and thorny, pubescent stems. The flowers are generally small, white, and inconspicuous, highlighted by several brightly colored modified leaves called bracts. The bracts can vary in color, ranging from white, red, mauve, purple-red, or orange. Its fruit is a small, inconspicuous, dry, elongated achene.

Distribution
Bougainvillea spectabilis is native to Brazil, Peru, Bolivia, and Chubut Province, Argentina, but it has been introduced in many other areas.

Cultivation
Bougainvillea spectabilis can grow in hardiness zones 10-11, preferring full sun , dry conditions, and fertile soil. It can be propagated from stem and root cuttings.

Uses

Traditional Medicine
The Yanadi tribe of Chittoor district, Andhra Pradesh, India, once used the leaves of Bougainvillea spectabilis to heal diabetes. The plant is also widely grown as an ornamental plant.

See also
Glendora bougainvillea

References

Nyctaginaceae
Flora of South America